Metarbelodes is a genus of moths in the family Cossidae.

Species
 Metarbelodes obliqualinea Bethune-Baker, 1909
 Metarbelodes umtaliana Aurivillius, 1901

Former species
 Metarbelodes ngazidya Viette, 1981

References

External links
Natural History Museum Lepidoptera generic names catalog

Metarbelinae